Pat Viray (born November 14, 1985) is an American former professional soccer player who last played with the Richmond Kickers of the USL Second Division (now USL League One). Viray played college soccer for the VCU Rams.

Career 
Viray played one season of professional soccer with the Richmond Kickers. He made 14 appearances, scoring once.

References 

1985 births
Living people
Soccer players from Virginia
Sportspeople from Fairfax County, Virginia
People from Reston, Virginia
VCU Rams men's soccer players
Richmond Kickers players
Association football midfielders
American soccer players